Spodoptera umbraculata is a moth of the  family Noctuidae endemic to New South Wales and Queensland.  The larvae feed on grasses.

See also 
 African armyworm (Spodoptera exempta)

External links
Australian Faunal Directory

Spodoptera
Moths described in 1858